Hans Jacob Grøgaard (5 April 1764 – 22 March 1836) was a Norwegian parish priest and writer. He served as a representative at the Norwegian Constituent Assembly in 1814.

Background
Hans Jacob Grøgaard was born in Åsnes in Hedmark, Norway. At age three, the family moved to Bergen, where his father was sexton at  St. Jørgen's Hospital Church (St. Jørgen hospitalkirke).  Grøgaard started  his education at the Bergen Cathedral School.  He studied theology in Copenhagen and earned his theological degree in 1784.

Career
In 1797, he became a chaplain at  Øyestad Church in Aust-Agder.  In 1811, he became vicar at Vestre Moland in Aust-Agder.  In 1822, he became pastor at Nykirken in Bergen and in 1832 he was offered the episcopal office in Christiania (now Oslo), but had to decline because of poor health. He published the text book ABC in 1815, and the reader Læsebog for Børn, især i Omgangsskoledistrikterne in 1816. Both were used within schools throughout Norway during much of the 1800s

Hans Jacob Grøgaard represented Nedenes amt (now Aust-Agder) at the Norwegian Constituent Assembly in 1814. He was joined fellow delegates  Ole Knudsen Tvedten and  Henrik Carstensen. At Eidsvoll, he supported the position of the union party (Unionspartiet

References

External links
Representantene på Eidsvoll 1814 (Cappelen Damm AS)
 Men of Eidsvoll (eidsvollsmenn)

Related Reading
Holme Jørn (2014) De kom fra alle kanter - Eidsvollsmennene og deres hus  (Oslo: Cappelen Damm) 

1764 births
1836 deaths
People from Åsnes
People educated at the Bergen Cathedral School
Fathers of the Constitution of Norway
Norwegian priest-politicians